Fabián Andrés Vargas Rivera  (born 17 April 1980) is a Colombian former professional footballer who played as a midfielder. He spent most of his professional career playing for América de Cali and Boca Juniors, making more than 100 appearances for both clubs. He also played for Internacional, Almería, AEK Athens, Independiente, Barcelona SC, Millonarios, and La Equidad. At international level, he represented the Colombia national team 41 times and also captained the side.

Career
Vargas was born in Bogotá, Colombia. He began his career with América de Cali aged 18, in 1998. He played there for five years before transferring to Boca Juniors in 2003.

While on loan at Brazilian side SC Internacional from Boca Juniors, Vargas played in the side which beat FC Barcelona 1–0 at the 2006 FIFA Club World Cup Final in Japan.

On 18 June 2009, Vargas has signed a three-year deal with Spanish club UD Almería for a fee worth €4million ($6.5 million). On 5 September 2009, he broke his fibula during a 2010 World Cup qualification match with Colombia against Ecuador. The following day, it was revealed that Vargas had torn a ligament in his left ankle and would initially not be able to play for three months. However, his recovery was pushed back to seven months in January 2010. He returned to action on 28 February, playing the last 5 minutes of a 2-0 win over Racing Santander.

AEK Athens
On 26 August 2011, Vargas signed with Superleague Greece club AEK Athens on a 1+1 year deal keeping him at the club until 2013.

Vargas scored his first goal for AEK on his second league appearance against Xanthi, making the scoreline 1–1 with a bicycle kick. AEK went on to win the match 4–3.

In July 2012 Vargas agreed to have his contract terminated in order for AEK to pay off club debts.

Deportivo La Equidad
In July 2016 Vargas moved to La Equidad on a free transfer. In his game against his former club América de Cali he played his 600th match as a professional football player.

Style of play
Vargas is a player with a physical approach to the game which earned him a reputation for being a dirty player. His nickname is el perro (the dog).

Honours

América de Cali
 Copa Mustang: 2000, 2001, 2002–1
 Copa Merconorte: 1999

Internacional
 FIFA Club World Cup: 2006
 Recopa Sudamericana: 2007

Boca Juniors
 Primera División Argentina: Apertura 2003, Apertura 2005, Clausura 2006, Apertura 2008
 Intercontinental Cup: 2003
 Copa Sudamericana: 2004, 2005
 Recopa Sudamericana: 2005, 2008

Colombia
 Copa America: 2001

References

External links
 
 
 
 Fabián Vargas at ESPN Deportes 
 argentinesoccer.com
 Boca Juniors stats at Historiadeboca.com.ar 

1980 births
Living people
Footballers from Bogotá
Association football midfielders
Colombian footballers
América de Cali footballers
Boca Juniors footballers
Sport Club Internacional players
UD Almería players
AEK Athens F.C. players
Club Atlético Independiente footballers
Barcelona S.C. footballers
Millonarios F.C. players
La Equidad footballers
Colombia international footballers
2001 Copa América players
2007 Copa América players
Colombian expatriate footballers
Expatriate footballers in Argentina
Expatriate footballers in Brazil
Expatriate footballers in Spain
Expatriate footballers in Greece
Expatriate footballers in Ecuador
Categoría Primera A players
Argentine Primera División players
La Liga players
Super League Greece players
Ecuadorian Serie A players
Copa América-winning players